Offense or offence may refer to:

Common meanings
 Offense or crime, a violation of penal law
 An insult, or negative feeling in response to a perceived insult
 An attack, a proactive offensive engagement
 Sin, an act that violates a known moral rule
 Offense (sports), the action of engaging an opposing team with the objective of scoring

Media
 The Offence, a 1972 drama film directed by Sidney Lumet
 "Offense" (Law & Order: Criminal Intent), an episode of Law & Order: Criminal Intent, 2008

Other uses
 Offense (policy debate), arguments that make a definite value judgment about an advocacy
 Religious offense, an offense against religion

See also
 Offender (disambiguation)
 Offensive (disambiguation)